Aq Qaleh (also Romanized as Āq Qal‘eh; also known as Āq Kalmeh) is a village in the Central District of Sareyn County, Ardabil Province, Iran. At the 2006 census, its population was 286 in 65 families.

References 

Towns and villages in Sareyn County